Aïn Témouchent is a province (wilaya) in northwestern Algeria, named after its capital: Aïn Témouchent.

History
The province was created from Sidi Bel Abbès Province in 1984.

Administrative divisions
It is made up of 8 districts and 28 municipalities.

The districts are:

 Aïn Kihel
 Aïn Larbaâ
 Aïn Témouchent
 Béni Saf
 El Amria
 El Malah
 Hammam Bou Hadjar
 Oulhassa Gheraba

The municipalities are:

 Aghlal
 Aïn El Arbaa
 Aïn Kihal
 Aïn Témouchent
 Aïn Tolba
 Aoubellil
 Beni Saf
 Bou Zedjar
 Chaabet El Ham
 Chentouf
 El Amria
 El Emir Abdelkader
 El Malah
 El Messaid
 Hammam Bouhadjar
 Hassasna
 Hassi El Ghella
 Oued Berkeche
 Oued Sabah
 Ouled Boudjemaa
 Ouled Kihal
 Oulhaca El Gheraba
 Sidi Ben Adda
 Sidi Boumedienne
 Sidi Ouriache
 Sidi Safi
 Tamzoura
 Terga

References

External links
 Official website

 
Provinces of Algeria
States and territories established in 1984